Tiger in the Rain is an album by singer-songwriter Michael Franks, released in 1979 on Warner Bros.

It was his first album not produced by Tommy LiPuma, Al Schmitt, and Lee Hershberg. The album was arranged and produced by John Simon. Franks plays guitar, banjo, and mandolin. The album cover features "Tiger in a Tropical Storm", an oil painting by Henri Rousseau.

Reception

A. Colin Flood wrote in the Enjoy The Music magazine the album "[continues to] express Franks’ original synthesis of smooth jazz/rock fusion, again with the understated South American underbeats" that "subsides into clever adult sentiments. This album celebrates an easy life of success"

For PopMatters, Rob Caldwell praised the "clever turn[s] of phrase" that work at a "symbolic level (Franks wasn’t a literature major for nothing)" and "[t]here’s something to be said for escapism, for the armchair-travelling Michael Franks’ music offers."

Music critic Stephen J. Matteo commented for AllMusic the album was "[l]ush, romantic and more experimental than previous efforts" and that while "none of its songs has the instant appeal of some of his earlier writing, the album as a whole is as refreshing and meditative as a stroll through a rain forest."

Track listing

Charts

Personnel

Musicians
 Michael Franks – vocals, guitar, banjo, mandolin
 Randy Brecker – trumpet
 Claudio Roditi – trumpet
 Lew Soloff – piccolo trumpet
 John Clark – French horn
 Tom "Bones" Malone – trombone
 Lew Del Gatto – saxophone
 Lou Marini – saxophone
 Seldon Powell – saxophone
 George Young – saxophone, flute
 Howard Leshaw – flute
 Dave Liebman – flute
 Kenny Barron – piano
 Paul Griffin – organ
 Bob Leinbach – organ
 Mike Mainieri – vibraphone, vocals
 Joe Caro – guitars
 Bucky Pizzarelli – guitar
 Ron Carter – double bass
 Rick Marotta – drums
 Ben Riley – drums
 Buddy Williams – drums
 Dominic Cortese – concertina, percussion
 Rubens Bassini – percussion
 John Simon – percussion
 Errol "Crusher" Bennett – congas
 Flora Purim – background vocals
 Maretha Stewart – background vocals
 Hilda Harris – background vocals

String section
Violins: Charles Libove, Harry Lookofsky, Lewis Eley, Anthony Posk, Harry Urbont, Joseph Malin, Richard Sortomme
Viola: Harold Coletta, Richard Maximoff, Emanuel Vardi
Cello: Abdul Wadud, Jesse Levy, Charles McCracken, Allan Shulman.

Support
 Lee Herschbergremastering
 Glenn Bergeraudio mixing

References

Bibliography

 

Michael Franks (musician) albums
1979 albums
Albums produced by John Simon (record producer)
Warner Records albums